Qezkhachlu (also Romanized as Qezkhāchlū; also known as Ghiz Khachloo, Kizkish, Kizkishli, Qīzkhāchlū, Qīz Khājlū, Qīz Khāshlū, and Qīzqashlī) is a village in Baba Jik Rural District, in the Central District of Chaldoran County, West Azerbaijan Province, Iran. At the 2006 census, its population was 101, in 21 families.

References 

Populated places in Chaldoran County